Liu Chengyu (born 1961/1962) is a Chinese businessman and billionaire who founded solar power supply equipment manufacturer Shenzhen Kstar Science and Technology.

He lives in Shenzhen, China.

Forbes lists his net worth as of April 2022 at $1.1 billion USD.

References 

Chinese billionaires
Chinese company founders
20th-century Chinese businesspeople
21st-century Chinese businesspeople
Living people
1960s births